Ashland Municipal Airport (Sumner Parker Field)  is two miles east of Ashland, in Jackson County, Oregon. The National Plan of Integrated Airport Systems for 2011 through 2015 categorized it as a general aviation facility.

Facilities

The airport covers 94 acres (38 ha) at an elevation of 1,885 feet (575 m). Its one runway, 12/30, is 3,603 by 75 feet (1,098 x 23 m).

In the year ending April 10, 2012 the airport had 26,050 aircraft operations, average 71 per day: 94% general aviation, 6% air taxi, and <1% military. 62 aircraft were then based at the airport: 79% single-engine, 8% helicopter, 6.5% multi-engine, and 6.5% ultralight.

References

External links 
 Aerial image as of August 1994 from USGS The National Map
 

Airports in Jackson County, Oregon
Buildings and structures in Ashland, Oregon